The BBC Radio Comedy Writers' Bursary (or the BBC Radio Comedy Department Contract Writer) is a scheme through which emerging comedy writers work in-house at the BBC Radio Comedy department for a year.

History
The scheme began in 1978 and was devised by the then-head of Head of BBC Light Entertainment (Radio), David Hatch, and BBC Television's Head of Light Entertainment, James Gilbert. Each department put £5000 a year into a kitty to employ three young writers on a one-year contract. The only proviso was that there was to be no contract for a second year, and that the writers must then fend for themselves. The first beneficiaries were Rory McGrath, Jimmy Mulville and Guy Jenkin, who were followed by Rob Grant, Doug Naylor (Red Dwarf). Since then, the scheme has helped several aspiring or part-time writers to go full-time and has produced a great number of professional writers and comedians, including John O'Farrell, Peter Baynham, Stewart Lee and Simon Blackwell (The Thick Of It, Veep).

Duties of recipients
Under the current regime, those selected for the bursary work on BBC Radio 4's three high-profile topical shows; The News Quiz, The Now Show and Dead Ringers, contribute writing across the range of the BBC Radio Comedy Department's output as well as script-editing sketch-shows and sitcoms. Bursary recipients are also encouraged to develop new formats and create their own shows.

List of recipients 
 1978: Rory McGrath, Jimmy Mulville, Guy Jenkin
 1979: Rob Grant, Doug Naylor, Martin Bergman
 1980: Jon Canter, Angus Deayton, Tony Sarchet
 1981: Scheme not run
 1982: James Hendrie, Eddie Canfor-Dumas, David Jackson Young
 1983: John Collee, Roger Planer
 1984: Jack Docherty, Moray Hunter
 1985: Malcolm Williamson, Stuart Silver, Alan Whiting
 1986: Stephen Punt, David Bond, Paul Hawksbee
 1987: Mike Coleman, Bill Matthews, Ged Parsons, Les Peters Rowley
 1988: John O’Farrell, Mark Burton
 1989: Peter Kerry, Simon Bullivant, Mark Brisenden
 1990: Peter Baynham, Barry Atkins
 1991: Robert Steele, Julian Dutton, Richard Herring, Stewart Lee
 1992: Clive Coleman, Andy Riley, Kevin Cecil
 1993: Rob Colley, Millie Murray, Paul Powell, Georgia Pritchett
 1994: Dan Gaster, Andrew Clifford, Debbie Barham, Hugh Rycroft
 1995: Will Ing, Kay Stonham
 1996: Ben Ward, Dave Lamb, Tony Roche
 1997: Felix Riley, Tom Jamieson
 1998: Nev Fountain, Simon Blackwell
 1999: Jon Holmes, Andy Hurst
 2001-2003: Scheme not run
 2004: Rhodri Crooks, Paul Kerensa
 2005-2006: Scheme not run
 2007: Danielle Ward, Kieron Quirke
 2008: James Sherwood, Stephen Carlin
 2009: Gareth Gwynn, John-Luke Roberts
 2010: Jon Hunter, James Kettle
 2011: Benjamin Partridge, Andy Wolton
 2012: Jack Bernhardt, Tom Neenan
 2013: James Bugg, Gráinne Maguire
 2014: Gabby Hutchinson Crouch, Max Davis
 2015: Sarah Campbell, Liam Beirne
 2016: Robin Morgan, Jenny Laville
 2017: Laura Major, Mike Shephard
 2018: Kat Sadler, Catherine Brinkworth
 2019: Simon Alcock, Charlie Dinkin
 2020: Tasha Dhanraj, Rajiv Karia
 2022: Cameron Loxdale, Jade Gebbie

References

British television articles by importance